Ralph L. Humphrey (March 17, 1908 – April 11, 1961) was a member of the Ohio House of Representatives, serving Ashtabula County from 1949 to 1952, and again in 1961. He also served in the Ohio Senate from 1953 to 1960.  He died on April 11, 1961, while in office.

References

Republican Party Ohio state senators
Republican Party members of the Ohio House of Representatives
People from Plymouth, Ohio
1908 births
1961 deaths
20th-century American politicians